Barnaby Bear may refer to:
 
 "Barnaby Bear", the English name given to Colargol, the 1970s Franco-Polish children's character when the show was broadcast by the BBC
 "Barnaby Bear", the English name for Rasmus Klump, a Danish comic strip
 Becky and Barnaby Bear, a children's television series formerly shown on the BBC's CBeebies channel